A system in a package (SiP) or system-in-package is a number of integrated circuits enclosed in one or more chip carrier packages that may be stacked using package on package. The SiP performs all or most of the functions of an electronic system, and is typically used inside a mobile phone, digital music player, etc. Dies containing integrated circuits may be stacked vertically on a substrate. They are internally connected by fine wires that are bonded to the package. Alternatively, with a flip chip technology, solder bumps are used to join stacked chips together. A SiP is like a system on a chip (SoC) but less tightly integrated and not on a single semiconductor die.

SiP dies can be stacked vertically or tiled horizontally, with techniques like chiplets or quilt packaging, unlike less dense multi-chip modules, which place dies horizontally on a carrier. SiP connects the dies with standard off-chip wire bonds or solder bumps, unlike slightly denser three-dimensional integrated circuits which connect stacked silicon dies with conductors running through the die.

Many different 3D packaging techniques have been developed for stacking many fairly standard chip dies into a compact area.

An example SiP can contain several chips—such as a specialized processor, DRAM, flash memory—combined with passive components—resistors and capacitors—all mounted on the same substrate. This means that a complete functional unit can be built in a multi-chip package, so that few external components need to be added to make it work. This is particularly valuable in space constrained environments like MP3 players and mobile phones as it reduces the complexity of the printed circuit board and overall design. Despite its benefits, this technique decreases the yield of fabrication since any defective chip in the package will result in a non-functional packaged integrated circuit, even if all other modules in that same package are functional.

SiPs are in contrast to the common system on a chip (SoC) integrated circuit architecture which integrates components based on function into a single circuit die. An SoC will typically integrate a CPU, graphics and memory interfaces, hard-disk and USB connectivity, random-access and read-only memories and secondary storage and/or their controllers on a single die, whereas a SiP would connect these modules as discrete components in one or more chip carrier packages. A SiP resembles the common traditional motherboard-based PC architecture, which separates components based on function and connects them through a central interfacing circuit board. A SiP has a lower grade of integration in comparison to a SoC. Hybrid integrated circuits are somewhat similar to SiPs, however they tend to use older or less advanced technology (tend to use single layer circuit boards or substrates, not use die stacking, use wire bonding for connecting dies/devices or Small outline integrated circuit packages instead of flip chip or BGA, use Dual in-line packages, or Single in-line packages for interfacing outside the Hybrid IC instead of BGA, etc.)

SiP technology is primarily being driven by early market trends in wearables, mobile devices and the internet of things which do not demand the high numbers of produced units as in the established consumer and business SoC market. As the internet of things becomes more of a reality and less of a vision, there is innovation going on at the system on a chip and SiP level so that microelectromechanical (MEMS) sensors can be integrated on a separate die and control the connectivity. 

SiP solutions may require multiple packaging technologies, such as flip chip, wire bonding, wafer-level packaging and more.

Suppliers 

 Advanced Micro Devices
 Amkor Technology
 Atmel
 AMPAK Technology Inc.
 NANIUM, S.A.
 ASE Group
 CeraMicro
 ChipSiP Technology
 Cypress Semiconductor
 STATS ChipPAC Ltd
 Toshiba
 Renesas
 SanDisk
 Samsung
 Silicon Labs
 Octavo Systems
 Nordic Semiconductor
 JCET

See also
 System on a chip (SoC)
 Hybrid integrated circuit (HIC)

References 

Packaging (microfabrication)
Integrated circuits
Electronic design
Microtechnology
Computer systems